The 1946 New York Yankees season was their inaugural season in the  All-America Football Conference. The team finished 10–3–1, finishing first in the East Division and qualifying for the playoffs. The team, however, lost to the Cleveland Browns in the AAFC Championship.

The team's statistical leaders included Ace Parker with 763 passing yards, Spec Sanders with 709 rushing yards, 259 receiving yards, and 72 points scored. Sanders total of 709 rushing yards also led the AAFC.

Schedule

Playoffs

Division standings

Roster
Players shown in bold started at least one game at the position listed as confirmed by contemporary game coverage.

References

New York Yankees (AAFC) seasons
New York Yankees
New York Yankees AAFC
1940s in the Bronx